The men's snowboard big air competition of the FIS Freestyle Ski and Snowboarding World Championships 2015 was held at Kreischberg, Austria on January 23 (qualifying)  and January 24 (finals). 
50 athletes from 18 countries competed.

Qualification
The following are the results of the qualification.

Final
The following are the results of the finals.

References

Snowboard big air, men's